Roman Catholic Diocese of Glastonbury is a former bishopric and present Latin titular (arch)bishopric in England.

History 
Glostonbury was the name of the-Reformation Diocese of Bath and Wells from 1197, when the Bishops of Bath annexed in vain the Benedictine Glastonbury Abbey and moved their see and title there, until the papal decision to reverse this was accepted in 1219.

Titular see 
In 1969, the diocese was nominally restored as a Latin titular see.

It has had the following incumbents, both of the lowest (episcopal) and intermediary (archiepiscopal) ranks :
 Titular Archbishop Thomas Joseph Toolen (1969.09.29 – 1976.12.04)
 Titular Bishop Kevin O’Connor (1979.05.28 – 1993.05.05)
 Titular Archbishop Peter Stephan Zurbriggen (1993.11.13 – ...), Apostolic Nuncio (papal ambassador) to Austria

See also 
Catholic Church in England

References

External links 
 GigaCatholic, with titular incumbent biography links

Catholic titular sees in Europe